The following is a list of football stadiums in North Macedonia, ordered by capacity.

Current stadiums 

Team in Bold: Macedonian First Football League clubs.

Stadiums Under Construction
Bitola Arena 12.000
City Park Kavadarci 10.000
Goce Delcev Prilep 16.000
City Park Shtip 10.000
FFM Center  12.000

See also
 List of European stadiums by capacity
 List of association football stadiums by capacity

References

External links
 North Macedonia at WorldStadiums.com

 
North Macedonia
stadiums
Football stadiums